"Someone I Used to Know" is a song by American country music band Zac Brown Band. As a single from their sixth studio album The Owl.  The song was written by Zac Brown, Niko Moon, Ben Simonetti, Andrew Watt, Shawn Mendes and produced by Andrew Watt and Happy Perez.

Background
The song was co-written by Shawn Mendes, who the band got acquainted during their performance on CMT Crossroads. Zac said: "Shawn is an incredibly talented artist and it's been exciting to watch his career rise over the past few years," said Zac. "We've had fun collaborating together, this Crossroads will be very special with huge vocals and musicality. It will be unexpected and something that both sets of fans will enjoy."

Music video
The music video was uploaded on December 21, 2018, directed by Phillip R Lopez. The video told a story about a high school football star who enlists, goes to war and returns with post-traumatic stress disorder, and it opened with a vivid sex scene and featured an interlude in which the main character and his fellow troops are attacked while on patrol. Upon his return home, he struggles with relationships, employment and his underlying PTSD.

Commercial performance
The song has sold 90,000 copies in the United States as of October 2019.

Live performance
On June 5, 2019, Zac Brown Band performed the song on CMT Music Awards

Charts

Weekly charts

Year-end charts

References

2018 singles
2018 songs
Zac Brown Band songs
Songs written by Zac Brown
Songs written by Shawn Mendes
Songs written by Niko Moon
Songs written by Andrew Watt (record producer)
BBR Music Group singles